Stand Your Ground is the second and final studio album by British rock band Wild Horses, co-produced with Kit Woolven at Good Earth and Maison Rouge Studios in London and released in May 1981 on EMI Records.

It was subsequently issued on CD in Japan in 1993 on Toshiba-EMI, and by the now defunct UK labels Zoom Club in 1999 and Krescendo Records in 2009, respectively. The most recent re-issue came in February 2013, courtesy of UK-based Rock Candy Records, and includes several bonus tracks not found on previous re-issues.

Track listings
All songs by Jimmy Bain and Brian Robertson, except where noted
Side one
"I'll Give You Love" - 3:44
"In the City" - 4:44
"Another Lover" - 3:26
"Back in the U.S.A.* - 3:50
"Stand Your Ground" - 3:36

Side two
"The Axe" - 4:20
"Miami Justice" - 5:00
"Precious" - 4:36
"New York City" - 3:26
"Stake Out" - 3:40

*Not to be confused with the Chuck Berry song of the same name.

Zoom Club re-issue bonus tracks
"The Rapist" - 3:34
"The Kid" - 3:12

Krescendo re-issue bonus tracks
"Everlasting Love" (live from BBC 'In Concert', 1981)
"I'll Give You Love" (live from BBC 'In Concert', 1981)
"Stakeout" (live from BBC 'In Concert', 1981)
"Stand Your Ground" (live from BBC 'In Concert', 1981)

Rock Candy re-issue bonus tracks
"The Kid" - 3:15 (B-side of "I'll Give You Love" single)
"Everlasting Love" (Buzz Cason, Mac Gayden) - 2:26 (1981 non-album single)
"Because I Care" (demo) - 5:36
"Are You Ready" (Brian Downey, Scott Gorham, Phil Lynott, Robertson) (demo) - 2:40
"The Kid" (demo) - 3:16
"Saturday Night" (Eddie Floyd, Steve Cropper) - 4:33 (live in Osaka, Japan; B-side of "I'll Give You Love" single)
"Rocky Mountain Way" (Joe Walsh, Joe Vitale, Rocke Grace, Kenny Passarelli) - 7:20 (live in Osaka, Japan; B-side of "I'll Give You Love" single)

Personnel
White Horses
Jimmy Bain - vocals, bass, rhythm guitar, keyboards, producer, arrangements
Brian Robertson - guitars, keyboards, backing vocals, producer, arrangements
John Lockton - guitars
Clive Edwards - drums

Production
Kit Woolven - producer, engineer, arrangements
Dave Bascombe, Gordon Fordyce, Chris Porter - assistant engineers

Release history

References

1981 albums
Wild Horses (British band) albums
EMI Records albums